The 2014–15 SK Rapid Wien season is the 117th season in club history.

Background

Background information

Rapid Wien finished the 2013–14 season in second place. Normally, the second place team would have entered the second qualifying round. However, Red Bull Salzburg, who qualified for the 2014–15 Champions League, won the 2013–14 Austrian Cup. Therefore Rapid Wien will start in the Play–off round.

In June 2014 it was announced that the new Allianz Stadion will be built in place of Gerhard Hanappi Stadium. Therefore, Rapid hosts its home games in the Ernst Happel Stadion this season and the pre-season game against Celtic F.C. was the last game ever played in the Gerhard Hanappi Stadium.

Transfers and contracts

In

Out

Pre-season and friendlies

Bundesliga

Bundesliga fixtures and results

League table

Results summary

Austrian Cup

Austrian Cup fixtures and results

Europa League

Europa League fixtures and results

Play–off round

Squad statistics

Statistics accurate as of 31 May 2015

Starting XI
Considering starts in all competitions.

Goal scorers

References

Austrian football clubs 2014–15 season
SK Rapid Wien seasons